Shadrinsk (also Sadrinsk) is an  former air base in Russia located 6 km southeast of Shadrinsk. It was home to 600th Military-Transport Aviation Regiment using the Ilyushin Il-76 aircraft between 1992 and 1998 as part of the 18th Guards Military-Transport Aviation Division.

References

RussianAirFields.com

Soviet Air Force bases
Soviet Military Transport Aviation
Russian Air Force bases
Buildings and structures in Kurgan Oblast